Church of the Holy Martyr Eugene is a Russian Orthodox church in Novosibirsk, Russia. It is located near the Zayeltsovskoye Cemetery.

History
In 1993, during the celebration of Easter, the first Divine Liturgy was held in the church.

Gallery

Burials
Archpriest Nikolai Chugainov was buried near the church, thanks to him a new church was built in Belovo and the church was restored in Kolyvan.

References

External links
 Народный каталог православной культуры. Folk Catalog of Orthodox Culture.

Churches in Siberia
Churches in Novosibirsk
Zayeltsovsky City District, Novosibirsk
Russian Orthodox church buildings in Russia